In Hawaiian mythology, Wahieloa is a hero associated with the Kaha'i and Laka epics.  

Variations of his name in other Polynesian languages include Wahieroa (Māori), Vahieroa (Tahiti, Tuamotus), Va'ieroa (Cook Islands), Fafieloa (Samoa), and Vahie'oa (Marquesa).

See also
Wahieroa - Māori
Vahieroa (Tahitian mythology)
Vahieroa (Tuamotu mythology)
Vahi-vero - Tuamotu

References
R.D. Craig, Dictionary of Polynesian Mythology (Greenwood Press: New York, 1989), 320-2.

Hawaiian mythology
Heroes in mythology and legend